Carla Power is an American author.

Early life and education
As a child Power lived in St. Louis, Missouri and also in Iran, India, Afghanistan, Egypt and Italy as her family moved around.  She studied at Yale University, then gained an M.Phil. in modern Middle Eastern studies from St Antony's College, Oxford and a degree from the Columbia University Graduate School of Journalism.

Career
Her book If the Oceans Were Ink was a 2016 Pulitzer Prize general nonfiction finalist.

Her book Home, Land, Security was a 2022 Pulitzer Prize finalist.

Books
If the Oceans Were Ink: An Unlikely Friendship and a Journey to the Heart of the Quran (2015)
Home, Land, Security: Deradicalization and the Journey Back from Extremism (2021)

References

External links
 Official website

21st-century American women writers
Year of birth missing (living people)
Living people
American women non-fiction writers
Yale University alumni
Alumni of St Antony's College, Oxford
Columbia University Graduate School of Journalism alumni
21st-century American non-fiction writers